Khudawadi is a Unicode block containing characters of the Khudabadi script used by some Sindhis in India for writing the Sindhi language.

Block

History
The following Unicode-related documents record the purpose and process of defining specific characters in the Khudawadi block:

References 

Unicode blocks